Dr. Narla Tata Rao Thermal Power Station or Vijayawada Thermal Power Plant is located at Vijayawada in Andhra Pradesh. It is named after, Narla Tata Rao, the erstwhile chairman of the Andhra Pradesh State Electricity board. The power plant is one of the coal-based power plants of APGENCO. It is well placed between Ibrahimpatnam and Kondapalli villages.

Power Plant
Dr Narla Tata Rao Thermal Power Plant is also known as Vijayawada Thermal Power Plant. It was developed under 4 stages, with the project cost of Rs 193 Crores and Rs 511 Crores respectively.

Again with an investment of RS 840 Crores 2 units were commissioned under III Stage.

The seventh unit of 500 MW was commissioned in 2009.

The station stood first in country during 94–95, 95–96, 96–97, 97-98 and 2001-02 by achieving the highest plant load factor.

The station has received many prestigious awards from various organisations. The station has received Meritorious Productivity Awards for 21 consecutive years and Incentive awards for 12 consecutive years.

Capacity

See also

References 

Coal-fired power stations in Andhra Pradesh
Economy of Vijayawada
Buildings and structures in Vijayawada
Companies based in Vijayawada
1979 establishments in Andhra Pradesh
Energy infrastructure completed in 1979
20th-century architecture in India